Stephanie Noel Styles is an American actress, singer, and dancer who made her Broadway debut in Roundabout Theatre's revival of Kiss Me, Kate. Styles also starred as Katherine Plumber in the first North American tour of Newsies.

Early life and education 
Styles was born and raised in Houston, Texas. She is the eldest daughter of Tony-award winning producer, John Styles, Jr., and Bridget Styles. She has one younger brother, John Henry.

Her interest in theater began at the age of four, after she saw The Phantom of the Opera in New York City, and her parents took her backstage; within weeks her parents had her enrolled at the Humphreys School of Musical Theatre in Houston, Texas.

Styles graduated from Episcopal High School in 2010 and earned the headmaster's Head of School Award. In April 2010 Styles represented Texas and was a semi-finalist at the National Shakespeare Competition at the Lincoln Center in New York City. In June 2010, Styles was named a top three finalist for the National High School Musical Theatre Awards (also known as the "Jimmy Awards") after earning the regional 2010 Tommy Tune award for best actress.

She then attended the University of Michigan, earning a BFA in musical theatre in 2014.

Career 
In 2003 Styles was cast as Louisa von Trapp in the national tour of The Sound of Music. Later in 2006 Styles starred as The Rose in The Little Prince at the New York City Opera.

In late May 2014, Styles was cast in the role of Katherine Plumber in Disney's first North American Tour of Newsies. She later left the tour along with co-star, Dan DeLuca, in 2015.

In 2016, Styles appeared as Suz Miller in Jenny Rachel Weiner's Kingdom Come at Roundabout Underground’s Black Box Theatre. In 2017, she portrayed Princess Ann, opposite Drew Gehling in the new musical, Roman Holiday, at the Golden Gate Theatre in San Francisco, California.

Styles made her Broadway debut as Lois Lane/Bianca in the Roundabout Theatre Company's 2019 revival of Cole Porter's musical comedy Kiss Me, Kate on March 14, 2019, starring opposite Kelli O'Hara, Will Chase, and Corbin Bleu.

She currently has a recurring role on the NBC show, Zoey's Extraordinary Playlist.

Theatre credits 

•

Filmography

Film

Television

Awards and nominations

Special honors and awards
 2010 – Top 3 finalist for the National High School Musical Theatre Award

References

External links
 Official website
 
 

1991 births
21st-century American actresses
Actresses from Texas
American musical theatre actresses
American stage actresses
Living people
University of Michigan School of Music, Theatre & Dance alumni
Theatre World Award winners